Karon is a village in Karon CD block in the Deoghar subdivision of the Deoghar district in the Indian state of Jharkhand.

Ancient names 
 Shri Ganj 
 KaranGram (during the reign of Karna of Mahabharata)
 Karon Gram (present official name)

Geography

Location

In the map of Karon CD block in the District Census Handbook, Deoghar, Karon is shown as being part of Karo mouza (MDDS PLCN - 920).

Overview
The map shows a large area, which is a plateau with low hills, except in the eastern portion where the Rajmahal hills intrude into this area and the Ramgarh hills are there. The south-western portion is just a rolling upland. The entire area is overwhelmingly rural with only small pockets of urbanisation.

Note: The full screen map is interesting. All places marked on the map are linked in the full screen map and one can easily move on to another page of his/her choice. Enlarge the full screen map to see what else is there – one gets railway connections, many more road connections and so on.

Area

Demographics
According to the 2011 Census of India, Karo had a total population of 5,110, of which 2,535 (50%) were males and 2,575 (50%) were females. Population in the age range 0–6 years was 643. The total number of literate persons in Karon was 4,467 (75.73% of the population over 6 years).

Civic administration

Police station
There is a police station at Karon.

CD block HQ
Headquarters of Karon CD block is at Karon village.

Education
Kasturba Gandhi Balika Vidyalaya, Karon, is a Hindi-medium girls only institution established in 2005. It has facilities for teaching from class VI to class XII.

Rani Mandakini High School Karogram is a Hindi-medium coeducational institution established in 1946. It has facilities for teaching from class IX to class XII.

Project Kanya High School Karon is a Hindi-medium girls only institution established at Karo in 2006. It has facilities for teaching in class IX and class X.

References

Villages in Deoghar district